Seine Bight is a village on the Placencia Peninsula located in the Stann Creek District of Belize. It is located 2 and a half miles south of Maya Beach Village and North of the village of Placencia. This small village has roughly 1,000 inhabitants, mostly Garifuna people who subsist on fishing, hunting, and homegrown vegetables. The early settlers named their village for their favored fishing tackle, Seine fishing and a bight, a bend or curve in a coastline.

References

Populated places in Stann Creek District